Moshood Adisa Olabisi Ajala, also known as Ọlábísí Àjàlá, was a Nigerian journalist, travel writer, actor, and later Lagos socialite. He is famous for being a globe-trotter, with escapades in Israel, Egypt, Palestine, India, the United States, and elsewhere. His only published book, which covered his travel adventures, was titled An African Abroad published in 1963. His name, in Nigeria today, is synonymous with 'travel'. His name is used as a slang today in Nigeria to tease people who cannot seem to stay in one place. They are called : ‘Ajala the traveller’.

Early life and education 
Olabisi Ajala was born in Ghana in either 1929 or 1934 to a Nigerian family. It was a polygamous family, with about thirty children and four wives. Olabisi was the twenty-fifth. When he was a child, his family moved to Nigeria. There he attended Baptist Academy in Lagos and Ibadan Boys’ High School in Ibadan.

At the age of eighteen, In 1952, he moved to the United States to study pre-medicine student at the University of Chicago. There he was the first black student in the Delta Upsilon Pi ‘fratority’, a co-educational Greek-letter organization. He later moved to Roosevelt University (then called "Roosevelt College") to study Psychology.

Travel in the United States 
In Chicago, Àjàlá conceived of a cross-country trip to Los Angeles on a bicycle. The trip "covered about 2,280 miles in 28 days. He started the trip on the 12th of June 1952, and arrived in Los- Angeles City Hall on July 10." The trip earned him many accolades, including coverage in the major newspapers of the time. Upon arrival in Los Angeles two days ahead of schedule, Àjàlá was received by the city mayor Fletcher Bowron.

He did not return to Chicago.

In Los Angeles, he became a mini superstar, and gave a lot of interviews. He was later cast in a movie called White Witch Doctor, based on the 1950 novel by Louise A. Stinetorf, and produced by 20th century Fox. He had been given the recommendation by Ronald Reagan whom he had met three years earlier. He was also signed up to act in the movie "Killer Ape" but never started work on it.

His calibre was accompanied by many women. One of them was a Chicago nurse named Myrtle Basset who gave him his first child named Ọládipúpọ́ Andrei Ajala (born on January 21, 1953). Ọládipúpọ̀ means "wealth has increased" in the Yoruba language. But Àjàlá had first denied paternity of the child. He had to be forced by the courts to pay ten dollars per week to the mother when he refused to show up in court to take the blood test he had ordered. Ọlábísí then disappeared and never saw Ọládipúpọ̀ again until 1976 when the latter had become a pianist. Ọládipúpọ̀ died on January 19, 2020.

Legal problems and deportation 
Later that year, after a number of run-ins with the American immigration for petty offenses like issuing false checks, he was sentenced to one-year suspended jail term. Also because he had abandoned his school work—he had supposedly transferred to Santa Monica Junior College but was not keeping up with his studies—he was ordered to be deported to Nigeria. He protested the deportation order, saying he would be executed by his father in a tribal tradition. First he climbed on an 80-foot radio tower, threatening to kill himself unless the order was rescinded. After nearly 13 hours, he jumped down from about fifteen feet and sustained a sprained back. He also then began a hunger strike, which he termed a 30-day Ramadan fasting, that he had to observe as a devoted Muslim.  Eventually, he was deported, but to London instead.

Return to America 
In December 1954, Ọlábísí returned to the United States with another wife called Hermine Aileen, a New York model. They settled in Chicago. In 1955, she later divorced him on charges of philandering and adultery, a charge he did not contest. In December 1955, he remarried again, this time to a 19-year-old London actress named Joan Simons.

Trip around the world and "An African Abroad" 
On April 27, 1957, Àjàlá began a trip "around the world" from London. These would form the basis for his 1963 biography called "An African Abroad", with an introduction by Tom Mboya. He planned to visit forty countries.

To write the book, Àjàlá had visited India, Soviet Union, Iran, Jordan, Israel, Palestine, Egypt, and finally, Australia. He travelled round all of them on his Vespa scooter, which had famous autographs of the famous people he had met. On his journey around the world, he met many more, among whom were Jawaharlal Nehru, Golda Meir, Abubakar Tafawa Balewa, Gamal Abdel Nasser, The Shah of Iran, and Nikita Khrushchev. He also visited Poland, Germany, Prague, Czechoslovakia, Austria, Yugoslavia, Albania, Bulgaria, Rumani, Hungary, and Turkey.

He also suffered encounters with law enforcement; once in the Soviet Union where he was accused of trying to assassinate Nikita Khrushchev by being too close to him in public, and at another time in the border between Israel and Palestine, where he was almost shot for speeding across without permission. All these were documented in his autobiography, which was published.

The book was written as a travelogue and a piece of journalism. He expressed opinion on how people lived in the places he visited, opined on the political situation in Israel and Palestine, as well as on the world leaders he met.

In Sydney, where the book was published, he married Joan and had three children with her.

Return to Nigeria and more marriage 
Afterwards, Àjàlá returned to Nigeria and became a famous socialite. He also became an entertainment promoter and publicist, who worked with artistes like Sikiru Ayinde Barrister. They later had a falling out.

He was praised in songs notably by Ebenezer Obey with the words "You have travelled all over the world. Àjàlá travelled all over the world...". From then on, the words "Àjàlá travels" became synonymous with wanderlust and extensive traveling. 

In Nigeria, he married Alhaja Ṣadé, and was reputed to have children by a few other women.

Last days and death 
While living in Lagos, Àjàlá suffered a stroke in the early days of 1999, and did not receive adequate care. He died on February 2, 1999.

Legacy 
Àjàlá is known today as Nigeria's most famous traveller, who ventured the world on his scooter. His name is equated to travel and adventure. His work as a journalist is not as well known, and neither are his philandering ways. His children continue to live in many parts of the world. His autobiography "An African Abroad" is being republished by OlongoAfrica in 2022.

References 

1999 deaths
1929 births
Nigerian journalists
Nigerian travel writers
20th-century journalists
Nigerian expatriates in Ghana
Nigerian expatriates in the United States
University of Chicago alumni
Roosevelt University alumni
Nigerian expatriates in the United Kingdom
Nigerian autobiographers
Baptist Academy alumni
Nigerian socialites